The 1979 Macdonald Lassies Championship, the Canadian women's curling championship was held February 25 to March 2, 1979, at the Town of Mount Royal Arena in Mount Royal, Quebec. This was the last women's championship to be sponsored by Macdonald Tobacco and also the first event to feature a playoff.

Team British Columbia, who was skipped by Lindsay Sparkes won the event by defeating Manitoba 7–4 in the final after also finishing first in the round robin with an 8–2 record. The Sparkes rink also went on to represent Canada in the inaugural Women's World Curling Championship, the 1979 Royal Bank of Scotland World Women's Curling Championship which they lost in the semifinal to eventual champion Switzerland.

Teams
The teams are listed as follows:

Round Robin standings
Final Round Robin standings

Tiebreakers
Five teams were tied for second, therefore there were three tiebreakers. The two remaining teams advanced to the semifinal.

Tiebreaker #1
Thursday, March 1, 6:30 pm

Tiebreaker #2
Thursday, March 1, 10:00 pm

Tiebreaker #3
Thursday, March 1, 10:00 pm

Playoffs

Semifinal
Friday, March 2, 9:00 am

Final
Friday, March 2, 2:00 pm

References

Scotties Tournament of Hearts
Macdonald Lassies
Mount Royal, Quebec
Curling competitions in Quebec
1979 in Quebec
1979 in women's curling